Wenchong station, formerly Wenyuan station during planning and construction, is a terminus of Line 5 of the Guangzhou Metro. It is located under the junction of Dashadi Donglu and Shihua Lu, in the Huangpu District. It opened in December 2009.

Station layout

Exits

References

Railway stations in China opened in 2009
Guangzhou Metro stations in Huangpu District